Alexander Dromgoole Sims (June 12, 1803 – November 22, 1848) was a U.S. Representative from South Carolina.

Born near Randals Ordinary, Virginia, Sims was a nephew of George Coke Dromgoole. He attended the rural schools of his native county and at the age of sixteen entered the University of North Carolina. He was graduated from Union College in Schenectady, New York, in 1823. Subsequently, Sims read law with General Dromgoole in Brunswick County, Virginia, and later was admitted to practice.

Sims moved to South Carolina in 1826 and settled in Darlington. He assumed charge of Darlington Academy in 1827. He was admitted to the bar of South Carolina in 1829 and practiced in Darlington.
He also engaged in literary pursuits. He served as member of the South Carolina House of Representatives from 1840 to 1843.

Sims was elected as a Democrat to the Twenty-ninth and Thirtieth Congresses and served from March 4, 1845, until his death. He had been reelected in 1848 to the Thirty-first Congress. John McQueen was elected to replace him.

Sims died in Kingstree, South Carolina, on November 22, 1848, and was interred in First Baptist Cemetery, in Darlington, South Carolina.

See also
List of United States Congress members who died in office (1790–1899)

Sources

1803 births
1848 deaths
People from Darlington, South Carolina
South Carolina lawyers
People from Brunswick County, Virginia
Democratic Party members of the United States House of Representatives from South Carolina
19th-century American politicians
American lawyers admitted to the practice of law by reading law
19th-century American lawyers